Adamantia Stamatopoulou (born 13 April 1966), known as Mando, is a Greek singer. She was born and raised in Athens by her jazz pianist father, Nikos Stamatopoulos and a classic soprano opera mother, Mary Apergi.

From a young age she began to develop her talent and interest in music, and was characterized as a "born musician". On 14 March 2010, Alpha TV ranked Mando the 23rd top-certified female artist in the nation's phonographic era (since 1960), totalling five gold records. On 21 April 2013 she participated at the Greek version of Your Face Sounds Familiar which was aired by Antenna TV Greece, where in the last episode (30 June 2013), she placed 4th. She was a special guest star in the semi-final of The Voice of Greece where she and one of the participants, Maria Elena Kiriakou, sang together Beyonce's Hit Listen
And she has presented her new song Poliploka from her upcoming album.

Early life
At the age of four Mando could easily sing operatic arias, gospel and jazz music. Her parents, astonished by her musical capability, signed her with the National Conservatory for piano and music theory lessons. Meanwhile, she took up vocal training and dance lessons. At the age of ten, Mando began to teach herself how to play the guitar and various percussion instruments. Her dedication and passion quickly led her to compose her own melodies.

Along with her school work, her music, and her English and French lessons, she performed in the musical "Jesus Christ Superstar", under the direction of Mimis Plessas and Dimitris Malavetas.

She has sung for various orchestras and as a member of various jazz groups and trios, working with music in all its textures: jazz, Greek, European, American,  and Arabic. She has sung and composed all types of music.

Personal life
Mando has two children, a boy and a girl. Her sister is Chryso Stamatopoulou, also a professional singer.

Professional career

1985–2002

After the completion of her music studies, she signed her first record contract with CBS, which gave her the international hit "Fill me up" and offered her the chance of an international career at a very young age. Mando remained in America for five years where she took up vocal training with Hal Sheaffer (vocal trainer of Barbra Streisand and Liza Minnelli) and interacted with many musicians, producers and with people who helped her talent grow. Her diverse knowledge and international edge defined her as the Greek artist with the international voice. Vangelis Yannopoulos, an A&R manager with record company Minos EMI heard of all these assets and signed Mando for her first album with the company that she stayed with for six successful albums: Dos mou ena fili... Afto to kalokeri" (Give me a kiss... This summer), "Ptisi gia dio" (Flight for two), "Kinisi triti" (Third move), "Esthisis" (Senses), "I diki mas I agapi" (Our love), and "Anisiho vlema" (Uneasy look).

She has released four albums under the Sony label: "Ston evdomo ourano" (On the seventh sky), "Gia oles tis fores" (For all the times), "Prodosia" (Betrayal), "Se alli Diastasi" (In another dimension). She also released three CD singles under this label. Mando's hits include "Danika" (Borrowed), "Faros" (Lighthouse), "Ston evdomo ourano" (On the seventh sky), "Esi" (You), "Fotia sta prepi" (Burn the have to's).

Her international tours have included cities such as Los Angeles, London, Paris, Toronto, Montreal, New York, and Chicago.

She has toured and collaborated with many established artists such as: Marinella, D. Mitropanos, Tolis Voskopoulos, Paschalis Terzis, C. Nikolopoulos, Dimitra Galani.

Mando has collaborated with the best songwriters in the Greek music business, such as Phoivos, A. Papadimitriou, K. Haritodiplomenos, N. Germanou, G. Theofanous, E. Giannatsoulia. Several of Mando's compositions have been sung by artists such as P. Terzis and K. Kouka.

Mando composes mainly on her guitar. She penned the track "Where You Are" for Jessica Simpson; it has been chosen as the theme song to 20th century Fox's film production titled "Here on Earth". It has sold more than one million copies.

An international collaboration is that with Jean Michel Jarre on one of his own tracks and sung by Mando in Greek with the title "Zoi" (Life); it will be included on her new album.

Another international collaboration is Mando's duet with Turkish top artist Sertab Erener, titled "Aşk/Fos" (Love/Light).

At the end of 2003, Mando recorded a new double album with Alpha records called Oi agapes fevgoun, ta tragoudia menoun (The loves are gone by, the songs remain).

2003: Eurovision

Mando's first attempt to enter the Eurovision Song Contest was in 1989; she was second, only one point behind Marianna. She took action against the Greek television station ERT because one of the jury members didn't vote. She won the ruling, but because it was too late to reverse the decision, Marianna went to Eurovision.

Mando was chosen to represent Greece at the Eurovision Song Contest 2003 with the song "Never Let You Go". She was placed 17th.

2008: Mando II and Afraid of the Dark

Mando planned a comeback for 2008 with two new albums: one Greek and one English. The first single from the Greek album titled "Dos Mou Logo Na Sotho" (" Δως Μου Λόγο Να Σωθώ ") is a rock song and was released as a music video on 10 May 2008, premiering on "Megastar". The album, titled Mando II, was released on 30 May 2008 with twelve new tracks.

The English album, provisionally titled Afraid of the Dark, has evident American beats and is a very promising international album for Mando. Four songs from the album were released by means of her official Myspace and the album was expected to be released sometime in 2009 but it was cancelled.

2011–2013: Phoebus 20 years, Shamone and Your face Sounds Familiar

In September 2011 her album Perfection was released from Polymusic. Tha se Perimenw (I'll be waiting for you), Mia Signomi ti na kanei (Sorry is not Enough) and Theos pano sti gi (God in earth) are some of more popular songs of this album.

On 24 September 2012, Mando participated in a special 20-year Anniversary concert dedicated to Phoebus.  The concert took place at the Olympic Stadium in Athens where the 2004 Summer Olympics were held. Mando sang her songs "Gia Oles Tis Fores" and "Daneika" along with "Emeis", a duet between her and Antonis Remos which are all songs written by Phoebus.

On 2 December, she appeared at Shamone, a night bar-club where she sang a lot of her songs and international songs such as Adele's Skyfall, Nina Simone's I Put a Spell on You and Madonna's Frozen. On 21 January 2013 she appeared at Half Note Jazz Club, where she sang a tribute to her singer and mentor Stevie Wonder.

The performance of Stevie Wonder which aired second of June was her biggest success on this TV show where she one first place in that episode.

During this season she gave many interviews in several Greek Late Night Shows like Ola with Themos Anastasiadis and Vrady with Petros Kostopoulos, and early-morning shows like Kalimera Ellada with Giorgos Papadakis and Fthistv with Thanasis Patras which all was aired by Ant1.

2014–15
She participated as a special guest star at the semi-final of The Voice of Greece where she sang her new song "Poliploka" from her upcoming album.

Performances on Your Face Sounds Familiar

Discography

Studio albums
1989: Dos Mou Ena Fili... Afto to Kalokairi (Give Me A Kiss... This Summer)
1990: Ptisi Gia Dio (Flight For Two)
1991: Kinisi Triti (The Third Move)
1992: Esthisis (Sensations)
1993: I Diki Mas I Agapi (Our Love)
1994: Anisiho Vlemma (Worried Stare)
1995: I Mando Ston Evdomo Ourano (Mando in the Seventh Heaven)
1997: Gia Oles Tis Fores (For All The Times)
1998: Prodosia (Betrayal)
2000: Se Alli Diastasi (In Another Dimension)
2003: Oi Megaliteres Epityhies (The Greatest Hits)
2003: Oi Agapes Fevgoun, Ta Tragoudia Menoun (Loves Go, Songs Stay)
2008: Mando II
2011: Perfection
2017: Bare Bones

EPs
1986: "Fill Me Up" (With Your Love)
1986: "Set Yourself in Motion"
2001: "Mando & Coltrane Big Band"
2002: "Ligo Ligo"

CD singles
2003: "Never Let You Go"

References

External links
 Official website: http://www.mandofficial.com
 Official Internet fan club

1969 births
Living people
Eurovision Song Contest entrants of 2003
Eurovision Song Contest entrants for Greece
21st-century Greek women singers
Greek pop singers
Greek sopranos
Minos EMI artists
20th-century Greek women singers
Singers from Athens
Sony Music Greece artists